Princess Maria Luisa of Bourbon-Parma (Marie Louise Pia Theresa Anna Ferdinanda Francisca Antonia Margaret Josepha Carolina Blanche Lucia Apollonia; 17 January 1870 – 31 January 1899) was the eldest daughter of Robert I, the last reigning Duke of Parma. She became Princess of Bulgaria upon her marriage to Ferdinand I, the then prince-regnant (who became Tsar after the Bulgarian Declaration of Independence in 1908). She was the mother of Tsar Boris III of Bulgaria.

Early life
Marie Louise was born in Rome in 1870 as Maria Luisa Pia Teresa Anna Ferdinanda Francesca Antonietta Margherita Giuseppina Carolina Bianca Lucia Apollonia di Borbone-Parma, the eldest daughter of Robert I, Duke of Parma, and his first wife, Princess Maria Pia of Bourbon-Two Sicilies. The couple produced eleven more children before Maria Pia died in childbirth in 1882. Later, Duke Roberto remarried Infanta Maria Antonia of Portugal and had twelve more children. 

Marie Louise, who was twelve at the time of her mother's death, was brought up in Biarritz and Switzerland under the care of English governesses. Fluent in five languages, she liked painting and music. Her talents playing the guitar and the piano were judged to be well above the average. She was also well read and knew a lot of Dante and Leopardi by heart.

Marriage

In 1892, her father arranged her marriage to the then reigning Prince of Bulgaria, Ferdinand of Saxe-Coburg and Gotha. The negotiations were conducted between Duke Robert and Ferdinand's mother, Princess Clémentine of Orléans. The engagement was celebrated at the Castle of Schwartzau, the residence of the Bourbon-Parma family in Austria. Marie-Louise and Ferdinand had never met prior to that day. Princess Clémentine, who was present on that occasion, described her future daughter-in-law in a letter to Queen Victoria as "Unhappily not very pretty, it is the only thing which is lacking, since she is charming, good, very witty, intelligent and very likable". The wedding took place on 20 April 1893 at the Villa Pianore in Lucca, Italy, the residence of Duke Roberto in Italy. Marie Louise was 23 at the time, nine years younger than Ferdinand. The couple wasted no time producing an heir, with son Boris born nine months and ten days after their wedding.

Family life

It is thought that Marie Louise was not loved by her husband. However, he made sure that in order to secure his lineage on the Bulgarian throne, she would bear him children. Under pressure from his subjects and looking to be recognized as Bulgaria's sovereign by the Russian emperor, Ferdinand wanted to have their eldest son, Boris, converted to the Bulgarian Orthodox Church in the summer of 1895. Marie Louise, who was pregnant at the time, argued bitterly against her husband's actions, with the support of her father and her mother-in-law.

Marie Louise and Ferdinand's second child received baptism with Roman Catholic rites. However, unable to avoid Boris's conversion, Marie Louise, who had threatened to leave the country, left Sofia that same day for Beaulieu. In May 1896, Marie Louise returned to Bulgaria. In the summer, she went to London with her husband for Queen Victoria's Diamond Jubilee, giving birth the following January to Princess Eudoxia. In July 1898, with her husband and their four-year-old, Boris, they visited St Petersburg at the invitation of Nicholas II of Russia .

Death
Disillusionment in her private life and bearing four children in five years affected her frail health. Suffering from pneumonia, Marie Louise died in Sofia, twenty four hours after giving birth to her fourth child. Aged just 29, she was buried in the Roman Catholic Cathedral of St Louis of France in Plovdiv, Bulgaria.

Children
Prince Boris of Bulgaria (1894–1943), Prince of Turnovo and Tsar 1918–1943 (as Boris III)
Prince Kiril of Bulgaria (1895–1945), Prince of Preslav
Princess Eudoxia of Bulgaria (1898–1985)
Princess Nadezhda of Bulgaria (1899–1958), married Duke Albrecht Eugen of Württemberg

Honours and arms
  House of Saxe-Coburg-Gotha-Koháry: Dame Grand Cross of the Order of St Alexander.

Arms

See also
Royal Consorts of Bulgaria

References
 Aronson, T. (1986) Crowns in conflict: the triumph and the tragedy of European monarchy, 1910–1918, John Murray Publishers, London; 
 Constant, S. (1979) Foxy Ferdinand, 1861–1948, Tsar of Bulgaria, Sidgwick and Jackson, London;

Ancestry

1870 births
1899 deaths
Nobility from Rome
Deaths in childbirth
Bulgarian consorts
Princesses of Bourbon-Parma
House of Saxe-Coburg and Gotha (Bulgaria)
Princesses of Saxe-Coburg and Gotha
Daughters of monarchs
19th-century Italian people
19th-century Bulgarian women